Dušan Nestorović (born June 26, 1986) is a Serbian footballer currently playing for FK FAP Priboj.

He was born in Prijepolje, southwestern Serbia. Previously he played for his home town club FK Polimlje, Montenegrin First League club FK Rudar Pljevlja and Serbian SuperLiga side FK Vojvodina.

Career
On 11 February 2019, FK FAP Priboj confirmed on their Facebook site, that they had signed Nestorović.

References

External sources
 
 Profile at Srbijafudbal.
 Dušan Nestorović Stats at Utakmica.rs

Living people
1986 births
People from Prijepolje
Serbian footballers
FK Rudar Pljevlja players
FK Vojvodina players
FK Dečić players
FK FAP players
Montenegrin First League players
Premier League of Bosnia and Herzegovina players
Serbian SuperLiga players
Association football defenders